Chandur Railway is a city and a municipal council in Amravati district in the state of Maharashtra, India. Chandur Railway is one of the three talukas (Other two are Dhamangaon Railway and Nandgaon Khandeshwar) in Chandur (Railway) subdivision in Amravati district.

Geography 
Chandur Railway is located at 20.8142° N, 77.9767° E . It has an average elevation of 332 metres (757 heyrd....

Demographics 
 India census, Chandur Railway had a population of 19,776. Males constitute 52% of the population while females 48%. Chandur Railway has an average literacy rate of 77%, higher than the national average of 59.5%; with male literacy of 82% and female literacy of 72%. 12% of the population is under 6 years of age.

Villages 
Amdori,
Amla Vishveshwar,
Ashrafpur,
Bagapur,
Baggi,
Baslapur,
Bhiltek,
Bori,
Budhali,
Chandur Kheda,
Chandur Wadi,
Chirodi,
Dahigaon,
Danapur,
Dhanapur,
Dhanodi,
Dhanora Mhali,
Dhanora Mogal,
Dhotra,
Dighi Kolhe,
Dilawarpur,
Eklara,
Ekpala,
Gaurkheda,
Ghuikhed,
Ibrahimpur,
Ismailpur,
Jahagirpur,
Jalka Jagtap,
Jawala,
Jawra,
Kalamgaon,
Kalamjapur,
Karala,
Kawtha Kadu,
Khanapur,
Kharbi Mandavgad,
Kirjawala,
Kodori Harak,
Kohla,
Lalkhed,
Malkhed,
Mandwa,
Manjarkhed,
Manjarkhed,
Mogra,
Murtizapur,
Neknampur,
Nimbha,
Nimgavhan,
Nimla,
Palaskhed,
Pathargaon,
Rajana,
Rajura (Bhiltek),
Salora Kh.,
Sangulwada,
Satefal,
Sawanga Bk.,
Sawanga Vithoba,
Sawangi Magrapur,
Sawangi Sangam,
Shirajgaon Korde,
Shivni,
Songaon,
Sonora Bk.,
Sonora Kh.,
Supalwada,
Taroda,
Tembhurni,
Thugaon,
Titwa,
Tongalabad,
Tuljapur,
Umarpur,
Wai,
Yerad.
Dhanora mhali

References 

https://www.census2011.co.in/data/subdistrict/4013-chandur-railway-amravati-maharashtra.html

Special Features:
chandur is only place in maharashtra which have horse carts (tangas)that's why every person which comes in chandur travels in horse carts.

Cities and towns in Amravati district
Talukas in Maharashtra